Moisés Calleros (born 14 May 1989) is a Mexican professional boxer.

On 26 February 2017 Calleros lost by split decision to Tatsuya Fukuhara for the interim World Boxing Organization minimumweight title.

On 18 March 2018 Calleros challenged Ryuya Yamanaka for the World Boxing Organization minimumweight title, losing by 8th round technical knockout.

On 23 October 2020 Calleros fought Julio Cesar Martinez, losing by 2nd-round technical knockout; Calleros was supposed to challenge Martinez for the World Boxing Council flyweight title, but came into the fight overweight.

Professional boxing record

References

External links

Living people
1989 births
Mexican male boxers
Mini-flyweight boxers
Flyweight boxers
Sportspeople from Monclova
Boxers from Coahuila
20th-century Mexican people
21st-century Mexican people